Punar Milan is a 1940 Bollywood film directed by Najam Naqvi and written by Saradindu Bandopadhyay. Kishore Sahu and Snehaprabha Pradhan played the lead roles in the movie.

Plot
Dr. Mohan belongs to an affluent, Brahmin family. On the day of his marriage to Shobhna, a question is raised about his caste. Upon repeated demands, Mohan admits that he does belong to a lower caste. Everyone is shocked, and the marriage is cancelled, leaving Mohan's family to wonder as to why he claims to be an untouchable person.

Cast
Kishore Sahu
Snehprabha
Devika Rani
Shah Nawaz
P.F. Pithawala
Mumtaz Ali
Anjali Devi

References

External links
 

1940 films
1940s Hindi-language films
Indian black-and-white films
Indian romantic drama films
1940 romantic drama films
Films based on works by Saradindu Bandopadhyay